Compounding is a legal procedure whereby a criminal or delinquent avoids prosecution in a court of law, potentially leading to the confiscation of his estate or some other punishment, in exchange for his payment to the authorities of a financial penalty or fine.  The agreement so reached is termed a composition.  The term is from the Latin verb compono, "I put together, join" (supine compositum). In general legal terminology, a "composition" is "an agreement not to prosecute in return for a consideration". It was commonly used by the victorious Parliamentarians against the Royalists after the English Civil War, for which purpose the Committee for Compounding with Delinquents was established in 1643. Another historical agreement was the Ausgleich, Austro-Hungarian Compromise of 1867, or Composition of 1867.

See also
Bankruptcy, compounding with creditors

References

Fines